Asian Culture (Yazhou Wenhua, 亞洲文化) is an international refereed bilingual academic journal published by the Singapore Society of Asian Studies.

Asian Culture was inaugurated in February 1983 and has published a total of 44 issues by 2020. It is an international refereed journal that publishes quality research papers in all aspects of Asia within the disciplines of anthropology, art history, history, literature, music, politics, and religious studies. It is a well-regarded journal in the field of Southeast Asian studies.

The current editors are Leo Suryadinata, Neo Peng Fu, and Jack Meng-Tat Chia.

References 
Asian Culture 《亞洲文化》

Annual journals
Asian studies journals
Cultural journals
Publications established in 1983
Multilingual journals